Isolate is the second full-length studio album by the Norwegian progressive metal band Circus Maximus. The album was released on October 24, 2007 in Japan, August, 2007 in Europe and September 4, 2007 in the US.

The cover-art for the album as well as a sample track containing an excerpt from the song "Wither", was released by the band on May 29, 2007 on the official Circus Maximus website. Like its former album, Isolate contains the same number of tracks (with the bonus tracks) and also track 4 is an Instrumental ("Biosfear" on The 1st Chapter and "Sane No More" on Isolate).

Isolate is also the first album to feature new keyboardist Lasse Finbråten after Espen Storø's departure at the end of recording of The 1st Chapter. Lasse Finbråten added more keyboard/synthesizer sounds to the album in both soloing and overall use. This is different from the previous album as Espen Storø's sound centered on the use of the piano.

The album entered the Norwegian national charts at number 70 in August, 2007.

Track listing
All music and lyrics by Circus Maximus.

Personnel
 Mike Eriksen − vocals
 Mats Haugen − guitar
 Lasse Finbråten − keyboards
 Glen Cato Møllen − bass
 Truls Haugen − drums

Production 
 Produced by Circus Maximus
 Mixed and mastered by Tommy Hansen (Jailhouse Studios)
 Artwork and layout by Mattias Norèn (Progart Media)
 Logo by Anja Sofie Haugen

References

External links 
 Official Circus Maximus website
 Official Circus Maximus forum
 Official Circus Maximus MySpace

Circus Maximus (Norwegian band) albums
2007 albums
Frontiers Records albums